Margaret Lewis may refer to:

Margaret Lewis (singer-songwriter) (c. 1941–2019), country music/rockabilly singer/songwriter
Margaret Ensign Lewis (1919–2017), American botanist
Margaret S. Lewis (born 1954), Wisconsin politician
Margaret Reed Lewis (1881–1970), American biologist
Marg Lewis, Australian politician